Schio is a town and comune in the province of Vicenza (region of Veneto, northern Italy) situated north of Vicenza and east of the Lake Garda. It is surrounded by the Little Dolomites (Italian Prealps) and Mount Pasubio.

History
Its name comes from Latin: escletum was a wood of oaks and it was first used in a document of some Benedictines from Vicenza. The first settlements were around two old hills, where now there are respectively the ruins of an old castle and a majestic neoclassical cathedral.

By the 12th century Schio had become an important centre of prosperous wool manufacturing. The city was ruled by the Venetian Maltraversi family until 1311.

Schio is now an industrial town thanks to Alessandro Rossi, who founded the biggest Italian wool firm (Lanerossi) in the 19th century. Rossi also arranged the building of houses, nurseries, schools, theatres and gardens for his workers. The most important textile factories in Schio were Lanerossi, Conte and Cazzola. Schio was called "Manchester of Italy", because it was the focal point of the northern wool trade like the British city.

After World War II, the Italian resistance movement committed the Schio massacre in a temporary prison building in July 1945, killing 54 inmates.

Main sights
The Weaver’s Monument, erected in 1879 by Alessandro Rossi who dedicated it to his workers. The inhabitants of Schio call it L’Omo (a dialect word for "man"). It is statue representing a man who holds proudly in one hand the shuttle of his loom, the emblem of his craft and indeed of the whole textile industry.
A tower of the Castle, demolished in 1514.
San Francesco (St Francis’) church, dating from the early 15th century. The church is now part of a complex of buildings, superimposed in time, which were used formerly by the Monastery dei Frati Minori (1437-1806) and then by Schio's civil hospital (the Baratto Institute 1807–1959) and now a home for the elderly.
The little church of St Mary in the Valley, originally a column erected in 1511 after a plague. It became a church in 1580.
Toaldi-Capra Palace. This building dates from the 15th century or earlier; some frescoes have been recovered in the interior. It first belonged to the Toaldi family; it then passed to Enrico Capra, a noble from Vicenza, before becoming the Town Hall until 1913. It was recovered and carefully restored in 1981, and now houses the civic Musical Institute as a centre for cultural activities.

Main events 

 In 2019, the TEDx Conference event was introduced for the first time, a significant step forward for the community.

Twin towns
  Landshut, Germany, since 1981
  Kaposvár, Hungary, since 1990
  Pétange, Luxembourg, since 1992

Notable people
 Josephine Bakhita, F.D.C.C. (ca. 1869 – 8 February 1947), was a Sudanese-Italian Canossian religious sister who lived in Italy for 45 years, after having been a slave in Sudan. In 2000 she was declared a saint by the Catholic Church.
 Olinto de Pretto, an industrialist who published a mass-energy equivalence equation in 1903, two years before Einstein
 Nicola Rigoni, Italian footballer
 Luca Rigoni, Italian footballer

Gallery

References

External links

Schio official website
http://tedxschio.com/

 
Cities and towns in Veneto
Castles in Italy